The Sri Aurobindo Institute of Medical Sciences (SAIMS) is a group of colleges located in Indore, Madhya Pradesh, India. The institute also features Mohak Hitech Speciality Hospital within the campus, the hospital performed youngest bariatric surgery in India. The institute is a part of Bhandari Group of Hospitals and Institutions.

Background

The institute was established by Dr Vinod Bhandari in 2003. It is named after the Indian yogi and philosopher Sri Aurobindo.

SAIMS also has the largest campus among medical colleges in Madhya Pradesh. The institute was recognised as the International Center of Excellence for Bariatric & Metabolic Surgery by Surgical Review Corporation (SRC), USA in the year 2012.

Sister institutions and hospitals
Within the main campus-
Sri Aurobindo Institute of Technology (Engineering)
Sri Aurobindo Institute of Medical Sciences Hospital
Sri Aurobindo Institute of Medical College & PG Institute
Sri Aurobindo College of Dentistry & PG Institute
Sri Aurobindo Institute of Medical Sciences College of Nursing
Sri Aurobindo Institute of Medical Sciences College of Allied Health & Paramedical Studies
Sri Aurobindo Institute of Speech & Hearing
Mohak Hitech Speciality Hospital
Mohak Cancer Hospital
Sri Aurobindo Institute of Laser Treatment
Sri Aurobindo Institute of Library and Information Science
Sri Aurobindo Institute of Management and Science
Sri Aurobindo Institute of Pharmacy
Laparoscopy Academy of Surgical Education and Research (LASER)

Other associated and acquired institutions and hospitals-
Bhandari Hospital and Research Centre
Indore Institute of Medical Sciences

References

Medical Council of India
Medical colleges in Madhya Pradesh
Education in Indore
Educational institutions established in 2003
2003 establishments in Madhya Pradesh